Pterygocalyx is a monotypic genus of flowering plants belonging to the family Gentianaceae. The only species is Pterygocalyx volubilis.

Its native range is Russian Far East to North Vietnam and Korea.

References

Gentianaceae
Gentianaceae genera
Monotypic Gentianales genera